Zack du Plessis was a South African actor famous for his roles as Hendrik van Tonder in Orkney Snork Nie and as Frikkadel in Vetkoekpaleis. He died on 15 June 2011.

Filmography

 Die Winter van 14 Julie 1977
 Pretoria, O Pretoria! 1979
 The Fifth Season 1979
 Blink Stefaans 1981
 Roep van die Visarend 1982
 Koöperasiestories 1983-1985
 Orkney Snork Nie 1989
 Vetkoekpaleis 1996-
 Kaalgat tussen die daisies 1997
 Mr Bones 2001
 Afspraak in die Kalahari 1975
 Liefste Veertjie 1975
 Jakkalsdraai se mense 1975
 Willlem 1976
 Funny People 1976
 Die Rebel 1976
 Springbok 1976
 Dokter, Dokter 1976
 'n Sondag in September 1976
 Thaba 1977
 Net 'n Bietjie Liefde 1977
 TJ 7 1978
 Diamant en die Dief 1978
 Sonja 1978
 Billy Boy 1978
 Weerskant die Nag 1979
 Die Eensame Vlug 1979
 Die Siel van die Mier 1979
 Skelms 1980
 Oom Kaspaas en Nefie 1980
 Kiepie & Kandas 1981
 Gazette 1981
 Harmonie 1982
 Gideon Scheepers 1982
 Bosveld Hotel...Die Moewie 1982
 Trans-Karoo 1984
 Die Hartseerwals 1985
 Die Jare Daarna 1986
 Konflikhantering 1986
 Hoekie vir Eensames 1986
 Koos Kluities 1987
 Die Seders van Lebanon 1987
 Dot en Kie 1988
 Vleuels 1989
 Tolla is Tops 1990
 Simon en Sandra 1990
 Tough Luck 1992
 Orkney Snork Nie! (die movie): 'Dis Lekker By Die See''' 1992
 Orkney Snork Nie! 2 (nog 'n movie) 1993 Torings 1994
 Lipstiek Dipstiek 1994
 Triptiek 1997 Onder Draai die Duiwel Rond 1997
 Kaalgat Tussen die Daisies 1997
 Arsenaal'' 2002

References

External links

1950 births
2011 deaths
South African male film actors